Kōsei, Kosei or Kousei may refer to:

Places 

 Kōsei, Shiga, a former town in Kōka District, Shiga, Japan

Transport 

 Kosei Line, a railway line in Japan
 Kōsei Station, a train station in Konan, Shiga, Japan

People 

 Charlie Kosei (born 1950), Japanese musician
, Japanese sport wrestler
, Japanese Paralympic swimmer
 Kosei Gushiken (born 1942), Japanese triple jumper
 Kōsei Hirota (born 1951), Japanese voice actor
 Kosei Inoue (born 1978), Japanese judoka
, Japanese footballer
 Kosei Kitauchi (born 1974), Japanese football player
, Japanese footballer
 Kosei Ono (born 1987), Japanese rugby player
 Kosei Shibasaki (born 1984), Japanese football player
 Kōsei Tomita (born 1936, dead 2020), Japanese voice actor
, Japanese long-distance runner

See also 
 Kosei Maru (disambiguation)

Japanese masculine given names